Horris Hill, is an independent day and boarding preparatory school for boys aged 4–13. It is located in Hampshire in England, south of Newbury in West Berkshire and near the village of Newtown. The school was founded on its present site in 1888 by A. H. Evans, a master at Winchester College. It is located within an 85-acre estate. Expats make up 15% of the total number of pupils at the school.

Controversy
In April 2021, Will Young opened up about his experience at prep school, claiming to have suffered from post-traumatic stress disorder (PTSD). "I've been thinking a lot about prep school, and wondering if any of those institutions will be brought to justice for the things that I saw happen... kids thrown against radiators. Other things I can’t talk about." Young also remembered drunk teachers "rolling around dormitories", one "you wouldn't go for a ride with", and teachers "looking at [students'] penises in the shower". He described feeling a sense of injustice, saying "I think I escaped – not that it didn't damage me."

Notable alumni
 Richard Adams, author of Watership Down, Shardik and The Girl in a Swing, from 1929
 Ben Britton, materials scientist and engineer
 Sebastian Doggart, film & television producer and director, and writer
 Benjamin Fry, psychotherapist 
 James Innes, author
 Douglas Jardine, Former England cricket captain
 Moray Macpherson, cricketer
 Patrick Minford, economist
 Jon Naismith, BBC radio producer
 Maxwell Woosnam, sportsman, from 1900 to 1905. An Olympic and Wimbledon doubles champion in lawn tennis, Woosnam was captain of the England national football team.
 Will Young, singer and winner of Pop Idol

References

External links 

Boys' schools in Hampshire
Preparatory schools in Hampshire
Educational institutions established in 1888
1888 establishments in England